Philip Michael Reardon (October 3, 1883 in Brooklyn, New York – September 28, 1920 in Brooklyn, New York) was a professional baseball player who played outfield in five games for the 1906 Brooklyn Superbas.

External links

1883 births
1920 deaths
Major League Baseball outfielders
Brooklyn Superbas players
Baseball players from New York (state)
Sportspeople from Brooklyn
Baseball players from New York City
Columbia Skyscrapers players
Brockton Tigers players
Burials at Holy Cross Cemetery, Brooklyn